Jorge Román (born in Palo Santo, Formosa, Argentina) is a film and television actor.  He works in the cinema of Argentina.

Filmography
Autumn Sun (1996)
Ashes of Paradise (1997)
Ángel, la Diva y Yo (1999)
Merry Christmas (2000)
El boonaerense (2002)
Potrero (2004)
La Mentira (2004)
My Best Enemy (2005)
Northeast (2005)
Ulysses (2011)

Television
"Archivo Negro" (1997)
"Trillizos!, dijo la partera" (1999)
"Infieles" (2002)
"Tiempo Final" (2004)
"Padre Coraje" (2004) aka Brave Father John
"Mujeres Asesinas" (2005)
"Monzón" (2019)

References

External links

Argentine male film actors
Living people
Year of birth missing (living people)